Kayne Ramsay (born 10 October 2000) is an English professional footballer who plays as a defender for League Two club Harrogate Town.

Club career

Southampton
A right back, Ramsay joined Southampton from Chelsea in 2017 as a youth prospect. After impressing in the youth teams he signed a professional contract on 19 September 2018.

On 30 December 2018, Ramsay was given his first team debut. Manager Ralph Hasenhüttl named him in the starting XI for the Premier League match against defending champions Manchester City at St Mary's Stadium. At 18 years and 81 days he became the youngest starter in the Premier League during the 2018–19 season.

Shrewsbury Town (loan)
On 31 January 2020, Ramsay joined League One side Shrewsbury Town on a six-month loan deal until the end of the 2019–20 season. Shrewsbury boss Sam Ricketts stated "He is extremely athletic, can carry the ball and drive the play forward and has strong potential". The move made Ramsay the club's fifth January signing.

Crewe Alexandra (loan)
On 22 June 2021, Ramsay joined League One side Crewe Alexandra on loan for the 2021–22 season, making his first league start for Crewe on 7 August 2021 in a 1–1 draw against Cheltenham Town at Gresty Road. On his 12th league appearance for Crewe, Ramsey suffered an injury against Sunderland on 19 October 2021, ruling him out of first-team action for 6–8 weeks. On 14 January 2022, Ramsay was recalled by Southampton.

Ross County (loan) 
On 14 January 2022, Ramsay joined Scottish Premiership side Ross County on loan for the remainder of the 2021–22 season shortly after being recalled from Crewe. Ramsey scored his only goal for County in a 1-1 draw with Livingston in the Scottish Premiership.

Harrogate Town 
On 13 August 2022, Ramsay joined League Two side Harrogate Town on a permanent transfer. On the same day, Ramsay made his debut for Harrogate Town in a 0–0 draw with Crawley Town.

Career statistics

Club

Notes

References

External links
Southampton FC profile

2000 births
Living people
English footballers
Association football defenders
Premier League players
English Football League players
Chelsea F.C. players
Southampton F.C. players
Shrewsbury Town F.C. players
Crewe Alexandra F.C. players
Ross County F.C. players
Harrogate Town A.F.C. players
Black British sportspeople